Thailand Women's Cycling Team was a professional women's cycling team, based in Thailand that was founded in 2017.

Team roster

Major results
2017
 Overall The Princess Maha Chackri Sirindhon's Cup, Phetdarin Somrat
 Best Asian Rider classification, Phetdarin Somrat
Teams classification
Stage 3, Phetdarin Somrat

2019
 Overall The Princess Maha Chackri Sirindhon's Cup, Jutatip Maneephan
 Best Asian Rider classification, Jutatip Maneephan
 Points classification, Jutatip Maneephan
Stages 1 & 3, Jutatip Maneephan
Stage 1 The 60th Anniversary "Thai Cycling Association", Jutatip Maneephan
The 60th Anniversary 'Thai Cycling Association' - The Golden Era Celebration, Jutatip Maneephan

2020
Stage 3 The Princess Maha Chackri Sirindhon's Cup, Supaksorn Nuntana

2022
 Overall The Princess Maha Chackri Sirindhon's Cup, Phetdarin Somrat
Stage 2, Phetdarin Somrat

National Champions
2019
 Thailand Track (500m Time Trial), Jutatip Maneephan
 Thailand Track (Individual Pursuit), Supaksorn Nuntana
 Thailand Track (Keirin), Supaksorn Nuntana
 Thailand Track (Points race), Chanpeng Nontasin
 Thailand Track (Individual Sprint), Jutatip Maneephan

2020
 Thailand Time Trial, Phetdarin Somrat

References

External links

UCI Women's Teams
Women's sports teams in Thailand
Cycling teams established in 2017
2017 establishments in Thailand
Cycling teams disestablished in 2020
2020 disestablishments in Thailand